Spongiphoridae is a family of little earwigs in the suborder Neodermaptera. There are more than 40 genera and 510 described species in Spongiphoridae.

Genera
These 43 genera belong to the family Spongiphoridae:

 Auchenomus Karsch, 1886
 Barygerax Hebard, 1917
 Caecolabia Brindle, 1975
 Chaetolabia Brindle, 1972
 Chaetospania Karsch, 1886
 Circolabia Steinmann, 1987
 Cosmogerax Hebard, 1933
 Eugerax Hebard, 1917
 Filolabia Steinmann, 1989
 Formicilabia Rehn & Hebard, 1917
 Gerax Hebard, 1917
 Homotages Burr, 1909
 Irdex Burr, 1911
 Isolabella Verhoeff, 1902
 Isolaboides Hincks, 1958
 Isopyge Borelli, 1931
 Labia Leach, 1815
 Marava Burr, 1911
 Mecomera Audinet-Serville, 1838
 Nesogaster Verhoeff, 1902
 Nesolabia Hincks, 1957
 Paralabella Steinmann, 1990
 Paralaboides Steinmann, 1989
 Parapericomus Ramamurthi, 1967
 Paraspania Steinmann, 1985
 Paratages Srivastava, 1987
 Pericomus Burr, 1911
 Pseudomarava Steinmann, 1989
 Pseudovostox Borelli, 1926
 Purex Burr, 1911
 Ramamurthia Steinmann, 1975
 Rudrax Srivastava, 1995
 Sparatta Audinet-Serville, 1838
 Sphingolabis de Bormans, 1883
 Spirolabia Steinmann, 1987
 Spongiphora Audinet-Serville, 1831
 Spongovostox Burr, 1911
 Strongylolabis Steinmann, 1986
 Strongylopsalis Burr, 1900
 Vandex Burr, 1911
 Vostox Burr, 1911
 Yepezia Brindle, 1982
 † Sinolabia Zhou & Chen, 1983 Qujiang Group, China, Albian

References

External links
 

Dermaptera families
Forficulina
Taxa named by Karl Wilhelm Verhoeff